Hassene Fkiri (born 22 December 1973) is a Tunisian wrestler. He competed in the men's Greco-Roman 97 kg at the 2000 Summer Olympics. He later wrestled for Australia at the 2010 Commonwealth Games and won the silver medal, but was ejected from the competition after being disqualified during the gold medal bout for making offensive gestures.

References

1973 births
Living people
Tunisian male sport wrestlers
Olympic wrestlers of Tunisia
Wrestlers at the 2000 Summer Olympics
Place of birth missing (living people)
Australian male sport wrestlers